Mesodon is a genus of land snails in the family Polygyridae.

Species
Species within the genus Mesodon include:
 Mesodon altivagus (Pilsbry, 1900) – wandering globe
 Mesodon andrewsae Binney, 1879 – balsam globe
 Mesodon clausus (Say, 1821) – yellow globelet 
 Mesodon elevatus (Say, 1821) – proud globe
 Mesodon mitchellianus (I. Lea, 1839) – sealed globelet
 Mesodon normalis (Pilsbry, 1900) – grand globe
 Mesodon sanus (Clench & Archer, 1933) – squat globelet
 Mesodon thyroidus (Say, 1816) – white-lip globe
 Mesodon trossulus Hubricht, 1966 – dandy globelet
 Mesodon zaletus (Binney, 1837) – toothed globe

Formerly placed here
 Fumonelix archeri – Archer's toothed land snail (as Mesodon archeri)
Fumonelix jonesiana – Jones' middle-toothed land snail (as Mesodon jonesianus)
Patera clenchi – Clench's middle-toothed land snail, Mission Creek Oregonian (as Mesodon clenchi)

References

Polygyridae
Taxa named by Constantine Samuel Rafinesque
Taxonomy articles created by Polbot